Puncheston railway station served the village of Puncheston, Pembrokeshire, Wales, from 1895 to 1949 on the North Pembrokeshire and Fishguard Railway.

History 
The station opened on 11 April 1895 by the North Pembrokeshire and Fishguard Railway. It was situated 100 yards east of a minor road. To the west was the goods yard and at the east end was the signal box. A grounds frame was also nearby, which operated the sidings. When the line was amalgamated in 1898 by the GWR, the signal box closed. The station closed on 8 January 1917 to transfer the rails from the line to France during the First World War. It reopened on 14 November 1921 but it was a temporary terminus until Letterston reopened in 1923. It closed to passengers permanently on 25 October 1937 and closed to goods on 16 May 1949. The nearby siding remained in use for W Evans trucks.

References

External links 

Disused railway stations in Pembrokeshire
Railway stations in Great Britain opened in 1895
Railway stations in Great Britain closed in 1917
Railway stations in Great Britain opened in 1921
Railway stations in Great Britain closed in 1937
1895 establishments in Wales
Former Great Western Railway stations